Abraha is a Tigrinya name meaning "bright face" that may refer to
Given name
Abraha, 6th-century Aksumite military general
Dhu'l Manar Abrahah, a Yemeni king
Abraha Asfaha, Eritrea's Minister of Public Works and Construction
Abraha Hadush (born 1982), Ethiopian long-distance runner 
Abraha Kassa, Director of National Security for Eritrea

Surname
François Abraha (1918–2000), Ethiopian Catholic Bishop of Asmara 
Ogbe Abraha (born 1948), Eritrean politician
Ruth Abraha (born 1989), Eritrean singer 
Siye Abraha (born 1955), leader of the Tigrayan People's Liberation Front 
Tekie Abraha, Eritrean football manager
Woldemichael Abraha, Minister of Transport and Communications for Eritrea

References